Kevin Szott (born April 14, 1963) is a retired American Paralympic judoka and former shot put thrower and American football offensive lineman. He is the older brother of Dave Szott who he played American football with while they were growing up, Kevin played for St Lawrence University as an offensive lineman in 1982 and is now a strength coach for the Penn State Nittany Lions football team.

References

1963 births
Living people
Sportspeople from Clifton, New Jersey
People from Millburn, New Jersey
Paralympic track and field athletes of the United States
Paralympic judoka of the United States
St. Lawrence Saints football players
American male shot putters
Athletes (track and field) at the 1984 Summer Paralympics
Judoka at the 1996 Summer Paralympics
Judoka at the 2000 Summer Paralympics
Judoka at the 2004 Summer Paralympics
Medalists at the 1984 Summer Paralympics
Medalists at the 1996 Summer Paralympics
Medalists at the 2000 Summer Paralympics
Medalists at the 2004 Summer Paralympics
American male judoka
Paralympic shot putters
Visually impaired shot putters